Libertas was a professional cycling team that existed from 1952 to 1967. Its main sponsor was Belgian bicycle manufacturer Libertas.

References

External links

Cycling teams based in Belgium
Cycling teams based in Spain
Defunct cycling teams based in Belgium
Defunct cycling teams based in Spain
1952 establishments in Belgium
1952 establishments in Spain
1967 disestablishments in Belgium
1967 disestablishments in Spain
Cycling teams established in 1952
Cycling teams disestablished in 1967